This is a list of mayors of New Albany, Indiana.

Source: Encyclopedia of Louisville.

References 

New Albany
Mayors
New Albany, Mayors